Vov is a village and municipality in the Lerik Rayon of Azerbaijan.  It has a population of 462.  The municipality consists of the villages of Vov, Vənədi, and Nısovyədi.

References 

Populated places in Lerik District